all the economic indicators that are the subject of economic forecasting
see also: econometrics
general trends in the economy, see: economic history.
general trends in the academic field of economics, see: history of economics

Economics